Szczepan Grajczyk (born 11 December 1931) is a Polish rower. He competed at the 1956 Summer Olympics and the 1964 Summer Olympics.

References

1931 births
Living people
Polish male rowers
Olympic rowers of Poland
Rowers at the 1956 Summer Olympics
Rowers at the 1964 Summer Olympics
People from Tarnowskie Góry
Sportspeople from Silesian Voivodeship